Herbert Heairfield (28 February 1907 – 28 August 2006) was an Australian cricketer. He played in one first-class match for South Australia in 1940/41.

See also
 List of South Australian representative cricketers

References

External links
 

1907 births
2006 deaths
Australian cricketers
South Australia cricketers
Cricketers from Adelaide